Cadboro may refer to:

Cadboro (schooner), an 1826 vessel in the employ of the Hudson's Bay Company in the 19th Century Pacific Northwest
Cadboro Bay, British Columbia, a bay and community named for the vessel
Cadboro Point
Cadborosaurus, a sea monster named for Cadboro Bay, where it has often been sighted